Matthew Cameron Brotzel, better known as RationaL, is a Canadian rapper from Saskatoon, Saskatchewan. On March 30, 2010, RationaL released his debut single "Cocaine Cowboy" off of his upcoming debut album, The BirthWrite LP. The song garnered a 2010 Sphere of Hip-Hop
 award for "Song of the Year", co-winning the honor alongside 2011 Juno Award winner and fellow Canadian rapper Shad ("Rose Garden"). On July 17, 2012, he released The BirthWrite LP under his own independent imprint, Ear RationaL Music.
 The album featured guest appearances from Quannum Projects recording artist Pigeon John, former Rawkus Records artist and member of The Procussions, Mr. J. Medeiros, Relic, Theory Hazit and Ohmega Watts.

In the fall of 2007, RationaL began the writing and recording process for his debut album, The BirthWrite LP. The album charted as high as #2 on the !earshot hip-hop charts. Although The BirthWrite LP is officially considered RationaL's debut album, there was a free promotional album released on July 20, 2010 entitled Hard Labor: The BirthWrite Prequel that circulated locally and was made available online. The BirthWrite LP is most notable for the award-winning lead single "Cocaine Cowboy".

2013–present 
On July 23, 2013, RationaL reached an exclusive agreement with the Toronto Blue Jays and Major League Baseball to release his new single, "A Swing and a Belt", dedicated to the late Hall of Fame voice of the Blue Jays, Tom Cheek. Cheek called a Major League record 4,306 consecutive games for 28 straight seasons on the Toronto Blue Jays Radio Network from April 7, 1977 to June 2, 2004. Produced by Imperial, "A Swing and a Belt" received high-praise from former World Series hero Joe Carter. Former Jays manager and current Sportsnet play-by-play man Buck Martinez also raved about the song. Martinez stated, "RationaL has captured everything that Tom Cheek was in regards to baseball. He had his passion, he understood his love of the game, he understood all the great moments in Tom Cheek's broadcasting career. He weaves them into "A Swing and a Belt" in such a way that it brings back so many memories for fans, baseball people and media people that really captures the essence of Tom Cheek's career with the Blue Jays. I don't think it could have been done any better." In addition, Sportsnet aired a clip of the song during the Blue Jays game versus the Houston Astros on July 27, 2013. "A Swing and a Belt" is also the lead single from RationaL's upcoming album entitled Hell or High Water, scheduled for release soon on Ear RationaL Music. Confirmed collaborators for the record thus far include Mr. J. Medeiros, Factor, Imperial, Josh Palmer and Juno Award-winning producer and emcee, Relic.

Guest Appearances

Discography
"Cocaine Cowboy" - Single (2010)

The BirthWrite LP (2012)

"A Swing and a Belt" - Single (2013)

Hell or High Water (2017)

References

External links
 
 
 RationaL and Paul Benjamin tour Rwanda

Canadian male rappers
21st-century Canadian rappers
Musicians from Saskatoon
Living people
Year of birth missing (living people)
21st-century Canadian male musicians